Hamza Muhammad Abdullah (born August 20, 1983) is a former American football safety. He was drafted by the Tampa Bay Buccaneers in the seventh round of the 2005 NFL Draft. He played college football at Washington State.

Abdullah has also played for the Denver Broncos and the Cleveland Browns. He is the older brother of former NFL safety Husain Abdullah.

Early years
Abdullah was raised in Southern California and is one of twelve children in his family. He was raised as a devout Muslim. He attended Pomona High School and played under John Capraro.

Professional career

Tampa Bay Buccaneers
Abdullah was drafted by the Tampa Bay Buccaneers in the seventh round (231st overall) of the 2005 NFL Draft. He was waived at the end of training camp and spent the first two months of the 2005 season on the team's practice squad.

Denver Broncos
On November 1, 2005, Abdullah was signed off the Buccaneers' practice squad to the active roster of the Denver Broncos.

Abdullah spent the 2006 and 2007 seasons with the Broncos, playing primarily on special teams and in a reserve role. He started his first career game on November 11, 2007, against the Kansas City Chiefs, logging his first tackle against return specialist Dante Hall.

A restricted free agent in the 2008 offseason, Abdullah signed his one-year tender offer from the Broncos on April 17. He was released by the Broncos on September 23 after the team signed safety Vernon Fox.

Cleveland Browns
Abdullah was signed by the Cleveland Browns on October 6, 2008, after the team waived wide receiver Steve Sanders. He was waived during final cuts on September 5.

Arizona Cardinals
Abdullah was signed by the Arizona Cardinals on December 22, 2009, after linebacker Ali Highsmith was waived.

Personal life
Hamza, together with his brother Husain, chose to take the 2012 NFL season off in order to make a pilgrimage to Mecca.

References

External links
Arizona Cardinals bio 
Washington State Cougars bio

1983 births
Living people
African-American Muslims
Players of American football from Los Angeles
American football safeties
Washington State Cougars football players
Tampa Bay Buccaneers players
Denver Broncos players
Cleveland Browns players
Arizona Cardinals players